Ahmed Khel is a town and union council in Lakki Marwat District of Khyber-Pakhtunkhwa, Pakistan.

References

Union councils of Lakki Marwat District
Populated places in Lakki Marwat District